Forgotten Voices of the Second World War is a book written by Max Arthur that consists of interviews with soldiers, sailors, airmen and civilians of most nationalities who saw action during World War II.  The interviews were drawn from the Imperial War Museum's sound archive.  Many of the recordings had not been heard since the 1970s.  As well as putting the interviews into chronological and campaign order, the book also puts the surrounding events into context.

External links
 Forgotten Voices website
 Imperial War Museum website

2005 non-fiction books
World War II memoirs
Oral history books
Collection of the Imperial War Museum
Books of interviews
British non-fiction books
Ebury Publishing books